Horgenzell is a municipality in Germany with 4528 inhabitants, near Ravensburg. Horgenzell was first named in 1094. In 1972 the villages Hasenweiler, Kappel, Wolketsweiler and Zogenweiler were added to Horgenzell. In 1974 the village of Tepfenhart was added to Horgenzell

At Horgenzell, there is the Ravensburg-Horgenzell transmitter, a facility for mediumwave broadcasting.

References

Ravensburg (district)